The following is a list of locomotives and multiple units numbered in the system used by ČD.

Electric locomotives

1.5 kV DC electric locomotives

3 kV DC electric locomotives

25 kV 50 Hz AC electric locomotives

Multi-system electric locomotives

Diesel locomotives

Diesel-mechanical locomotives

Diesel-electric locomotives

Diesel-hydraulic locomotives

Narrow-gauge diesel locomotives

Electric multiple units

3 kV DC electric multiple units

25 kV/50 Hz AC electric multiple units

Multi-system electric multiple units

Diesel motorcars and multiple units

Control cars

References

External links
 Imageer vom Alltagsbetrieb der ČD heute (in German)
 Beschreibungen von Lokomotiven und Triebwagen (in German)
 Beschreibungen von Prototypen (in German)

 
Czech Republic transport-related lists
Railway locomotive-related lists
České dráhy